Craig C. Cates (born Key West, Florida) is an American politician, retired businessman and former boat and car racing champion. Cates served as mayor of Key West from October 1, 2009, to November 19, 2018. Craig was married to Cheryl Hollen Cates who died of COVID-19 on December 2, 2020. He also is the father of three girls, Tammy, Nicole, and Crystal Cates. He has four grandchildren, Taylor, Trevor, Andrew, and Riley. Some of Craig Cates' hobbies include yachting, fishing, and pulling lobster traps. Cates was succeeded by Teri Johnston after he did not run for reelection.

References

Year of birth missing (living people)
Living people
Mayors of Key West, Florida